Plaxomicrus ellipticus is a species of beetle in the family Cerambycidae. It was described by Thomson in 1857.

Varietas
 Plaxomicrus ellipticus var. basiflavus Breuning, 1956
 Plaxomicrus ellipticus var. circumscutellaris Breuning, 1956
 Plaxomicrus ellipticus var. hanoiensis Breuning, 1956
 Plaxomicrus ellipticus var. imbasalis Breuning, 1956

References

Astathini
Beetles described in 1857